This list of the first women lawyers and judges in each state of the United States includes the years in which the women were admitted to practice law. Also included are women of other distinctions, such as the first in their states to graduate from law school.

Firsts nationwide

Law school 

 First female law graduate: Ada Kepley (1881) in 1870 
First African American female law graduate: Charlotte E. Ray (1872) 
First Native American (Chippewa) female law graduate: Marie Louise Bottineau Baldwin in 1914 
First Hawaiian Nisei female law graduate: Patsy Mink (1953) in 1951 
First deaf African American female law graduate: Claudia L. Gordon (c. 2000)

Lawyers 

First female to act as an attorney: Margaret Brent in 1648 
First female without a formal legal education admitted to state bar: Arabella Mansfield (1869) 
First African American female: Charlotte E. Ray (1872) 
First Russian female: Alice Serber (1899) 
First Native American (Wyandot) female:: Lyda Conley (1902) 
First blind female: Christine la Barraque (c. 1906)  
First female admitted to argue cases before a U.S. Court of Appeals: Helen R. Carloss (c. 1923) 
First Armenian American female: Norma M. Karaian 
First Japanese American female: Elizabeth K. Ohi (1937) 
First Chinese American female: Emma Ping Lum (1947) 
First Filipino American female: Ruby Carpio Bell (1964) 
First Navajo female: Claudeen Arthur (1970)  
First female solicitor for the U.S. Department of Labor: Carin Clauss (1963) in 1977 
First quadriplegic female: Holly Caudill (1995) 
First deaf African American female: Claudia L. Gordon (c. 2000) 
First Marshallese female: Arsima A. Muller (2005) 
First Air Force JAG Corps female officer permitted to wear hijab: Maysaa Ouza (2018)  
First deaf Pakistani-American and Muslim female: Nida Din (2020)

Lawyers and the U.S. Supreme Court 

 First female to argue a case before the U.S. Supreme Court: Belva Ann Lockwood (1873) in 1880
 First Native American (Wyandot) female to argue a case before the U.S. Supreme Court: Lyda Conley (1902) in 1909
 First African American female to argue a case before the U.S. Supreme Court: Constance Baker Motley (1946) in 1954
 First Asian American female to argue a case before the U.S. Supreme Court: Emma Ping Lum (1947) around 1958
First Latino American female to argue a case before the U.S. Supreme Court: Vilma Socorro Martínez (1967) in 1977 
First Native American (Lumbee) female to win a U.S. Supreme Court case: Arlinda Locklear (1976) in 1983 
First Muslim Arab American female to argue a case before the U.S. Supreme Court: Fadwa Hammoud in 2021

Law clerks 

First female to clerk for the U.S. Supreme Court: Lucile Lomen (1941) from 1944-1945 
First Orthodox Jewish female to clerk for the U.S. Supreme Court: Rochelle Lee Shoretz from 1998-1999 
First female of Native Hawaiian ancestry to clerk for the U.S. Supreme Court: Kamaile A. Nichols (Turčan) (2008) in 2016
First Native American (Chickasaw) (female) to clerk for the U.S. Supreme Court: Tobi Merritt Edwards Young in 2018
First blind female to clerk for the U.S. Supreme Court: Laura Wolk (2016) in 2019
First female to clerk for the U.S. Court of Appeals: Carmel “Kim” Prashker Ebb in 1945
First female to clerk for the U.S. Court of Appeals for the Fourth Circuit: Doris Gray

State judges  
First female justice of the peace: Esther Hobart Morris in 1870 
First elected female justice of the peace: Catherine Waugh McCulloch (1886) in 1907 
First female probate judge: Mary H. Cooper in 1908: 
First female juvenile judge: Mary Bartelme (1894) in 1913
First female elected judge: Florence E. Allen (1914) in 1920 
First female municipal judge: Mary O'Toole (1914) in 1921 
First female police judge: Julia W. Ker (1912) in 1926 
First African American female: Jane Bolin (1932) in 1939 
First sisters to simultaneously serve as judges: Cornelia Groefsema Kennedy (1947) and Margaret G. Schaeffer (1948) 
First Latino American female: Frances Munoz (1972) in 1978 
First Chinese American female: Patricia A. Yim Cowett (1972) in 1979 
First openly lesbian female: Mary C. Morgan (1972) in 1981 
First Native American (Ojibwe) female (federal judge): Margaret Treuer (1977) in 1983 
First Filipino American female: Lillian Y. Lim (1977) in 1986
First Vietnamese American female: Wendy Duong (1984) in 1992 
First Dominican American (female) elected: Faviola Soto (1979) in 1994 
First Muslim American female to preside over an American courtroom: Zakia Mahasa in 1997 
First Indian American female: Rena M. Van Tine (1986) in 2001 
First Hispanic American (female) to preside as an arbitrator on an American television court show: Marilyn Milian in 2001
First Korean American female: Jeannie Hong (1993) in 2002 
First Muslim American female: Mona K. Majzoub in 2004 
First Colombian American (female): Catalina M. Avalos in 2005 
First Arab American female: Charlene Mekled Elder in 2006 
First Ethiopian American (female): Nina Ashenafi-Richardson in 2008 
First Ecuadorian American (female) elected: Carmen Velasquez in 2009 
First known Pakistani American female: Pamela Leeming in 2009 
First transgender woman: Phyllis Frye (1981) in 2010 
First Egyptian American female elected: Sherrie Mikhail Miday (2001) in 2016
First Hasidic Jewish American female elected: Rachel Freier (2006) in 2017
First Hmong American females: Kashoua "Kristy" Yang (2009) and Sophia Y. Vuelo (1999) in 2017 
First Indonesian American female: Marissa Hutabarat (2010) in 2020 
First Tibetan American (female): Tsering Cornell in 2022 
First Sikh female: Manpreet Monica Singh in 2023

State Appellate Court 

 First female: Arleigh M. Woods (1953) in 1980

State Supreme Court 
 First female: Florence E. Allen (1914) in 1922 
 First female to serve as chief justice: Lorna E. Lockwood (1925) in 1970 
 First Hispanic American female: Dorothy Comstock Riley in 1982 
 First African American female to serve as chief justice: Leah Ward Sears (1980) in 2005 
 First openly lesbian female: Virginia Linder (1980) in 2007 
 First openly lesbian female to serve as chief justice: Maite Oronoz Rodríguez (2001) in 2016 
 First Native American (female): Anne McKeig in 2016

Federal judges 
First female (federal judge): Kathryn Sellers (1911) in 1918 
First African American female (federal judge): Constance Baker Motley (1946) in 1966 
First Italian American female (federal judge): Veronica DiCarlo Wicker 
First African American female (court of last resort): Julia Cooper Mack (1951) in 1975 
First Mexican American female (federal judge): Irma Elsa Gonzalez (1973) in 1984 
First Asian American female (federal judge): Marilyn Go in 1993 
First openly lesbian African American female (federal judge): Deborah Batts (1972) in 1994 
First Cuban American female (federal judge): Cecilia Altonaga (1983) in 2003 
First Chinese American female (federal judge): Dolly M. Gee (1984) in 2010 
First Korean American female (federal judge): Lucy H. Koh (1993) in 2010 
First South Asian female (federal judge): Cathy Bissoon (1993) in 2011 
First Filipino American female (federal judge): Lorna G. Schofield (1981) in 2012 
First openly lesbian Asian American female (federal judge): Pamela K. Chen (1986) in 2013 
First openly lesbian Latino American female (federal judge): Nitza Quiñones Alejandro (1975) in 2013  
First Native American (Hopi) female (federal judge): Diane Humetewa (1993) in 2014  
First Iraqi Chaldean American (female) (federal judge): Hala Y. Jarbou in 2020
First Greek American female (federal judge): Eleni M. Roumel in 2020

U.S. Bankruptcy Court 

First African American female: Bernice B. Donald (1979) in 1988

U.S. District Court 

First female: Burnita Shelton Matthews (1919) in 1949 
First Puerto Rican American female: Carmen Consuelo Cerezo (1969) in 1980 
First Asian American female: Susan Oki Mollway (1981) in 1988

U.S. Magistrate 
First African American female (chief magistrate): Joyce London Alexander (1972) in 1979

U.S., Circuit Court (Intermediate Appellate Courts) 

First female: Florence E. Allen (1914) in 1934 
First African American female: Amalya Lyle Kearse (c. 1960s) in 1979 
First Hispanic American female: Kim McLane Wardlaw (1979) in 1998 
First openly lesbian African American female (Seventh Circuit): Staci Michelle Yandle (1987) in 2014 
First Vietnamese American and Asian-Pacific female: Jacqueline Nguyen (1991) in 2012 
First African American (female) (U.S. Court of Appeals for the Federal Circuit): Tiffany P. Cunningham in 2021
First former federal (female) public defender to serve as a U.S. Circuit Judge: Candace Jackson-Akiwumi in 2021  
First federal (female) public defender to serve as a U.S. Circuit Judge: Eunice C. Lee in 2021
First openly lesbian female: Beth Robinson (1989) in 2021

U.S. Customs Court 

First female: Genevieve R. Cline (1921) in 1928

Supreme Court of the U.S. 

First female: Sandra Day O'Connor (1952) in 1981 
First Jewish female: Ruth Bader Ginsburg (1959) in 1993
First Hispanic American female: Sonia Sotomayor (1980) in 2009 
First African American female: Ketanji Brown Jackson in 2022

Attorneys General of the U.S.  

 First female: Janet Reno (c. 1963) in 1993
First African American female: Loretta Lynch (1984) in 2015

Deputy Attorney General of the U.S. 

 First female: Carol E. Dinkins (1971) in 1984

Associate Attorney General of the U.S. 

 First female: Rachel Brand from 2017-2018 
 First female of color: Vanita Gupta in 2021

Solicitor General of the U.S. 
First female (acting): Barbara Underwood (1969) in 2001 
First female: Elena Kagan (1986) from 2009-2010

Deputy Solicitor General of the U.S.  

 First (African American) female: Jewel Lafontant (1946) in 1973

Assistant Attorney General of the U.S. 

First females: Annette Abbott Adams (1912) and Mabel Walker Willebrandt (1917) from 1920-1921 and 1921-1929 respectively 
First Asian American female: Rose Ochi in 1997

State Attorneys General 

First female: Anne X. Alpern (1927) in 1959 
First female (elected): Arlene Violet (1974) in 1985 
First Mexican American female: Patricia A. Madrid (1973) in 1999 
First African American female: Pamela Carter in 1993 
First Asian American (female): Kamala Harris (1989) from 2011-2017 
First openly lesbian female: Maura Healey (1998) in 2015

State Solicitor General 

 First Muslim Arab American (female): Fadwa Hammoud in 2019

United States Attorney 

First female: Annette Abbott Adams (1912) from 1918-1920 
 First female to serve a full-term: Virginia Dill McCarty (1977) from 1977-1981 
First openly lesbian female: Jenny Durkan (1986) in 2009 
First Asian American female: Debra Wong Yang (1986) from 2002-2006 
First Native American (Hopi) female: Diane Humetewa (1993) in 2007  
First Muslim (female): Saima Mohsin in 2021

Assistant United States Attorney 

First female: Annette Abbott Adams (1912) from 1914-1918 
First African American female: Jewel Lafontant (1946) from 1955-1958 
First known quadriplegic female: Holly Caudill in 1995

Special Assistant U.S. Attorney 

 First female: Mary Grace Quackenbos Humiston (1904) in 1906

State Assistant Attorney General 

 First female: Ella Knowles Haskell (1888) in 1893 
 First African American female: Helen Elsie Austin (1930) in 1937

State District Attorneys 

First female: Edna C. Plummer (1907) in 1918 
First openly lesbian female: Bonnie Dumanis (1977) in 2002 
First Dominican American (female): Camelia Valdes in 2009
First Korean American (female): Grace H. Park in 2013 
First Puerto Rican female: Deborah González in 2020

State Deputy District Attorney 

 First female: Clara Shortridge Foltz (1878) in 1910

Federal Bar Associations 

First (African American) female to co-found a coed national bar association: Gertrude Rush (1918) in 1925  
First female president (Federal Bar Association): Marguerite Rawalt in 1943 
First female president (National Bar Association): Arnette Hubbard in 1981 
First Jewish female admitted (American Bar Association): Clarice Baright (1905) in 1919 
First African American female president (National Association of Women Lawyers): Mahala Ashley Dickerson in 1983
First female president (American Bar Association): Roberta Cooper Ramo in 1995 
First African American female president (American Bar Association): Paulette Brown (c. 1976) in 2014 
First Native American (female) president elect (American Bar Association): Mary Smith in 2022 (term to begin 2023)

State Bar Association 
First (African American) female to lead coed state bar: Gertrude Rush (1918 in 1921
First female president of voluntary state bar: Carole Bellows in 1977
First female president of mandatory/integrated state bar: Donna Willard-Jones from 1979-1980
First Latino American female president: Mary Torres in 2002 
First Korean American female president: Esther H. Lim in 2018

Firsts in individual states 

 List of first women lawyers and judges in Alabama 
 List of first women lawyers and judges in Alaska 
 List of first women lawyers and judges in Arizona 
 List of first women lawyers and judges in Arkansas 
 List of first women lawyers and judges in California 
 List of first women lawyers and judges in Colorado 
 List of first women lawyers and judges in Connecticut 
 List of first women lawyers and judges in Delaware 
 List of first women lawyers and judges in Florida 
 List of first women lawyers and judges in Georgia 
 List of first women lawyers and judges in Hawaii 
 List of first women lawyers and judges in Idaho 
 List of first women lawyers and judges in Illinois 
 List of first women lawyers and judges in Indiana 
 List of first women lawyers and judges in Iowa 
 List of first women lawyers and judges in Kansas 
 List of first women lawyers and judges in Kentucky 
 List of first women lawyers and judges in Louisiana 
 List of first women lawyers and judges in Maine 
 List of first women lawyers and judges in Maryland 
 List of first women lawyers and judges in Massachusetts 
 List of first women lawyers and judges in Michigan 
 List of first women lawyers and judges in Minnesota 
 List of first women lawyers and judges in Mississippi 
 List of first women lawyers and judges in Missouri 
 List of first women lawyers and judges in Montana 
 List of first women lawyers and judges in Nebraska 
 List of first women lawyers and judges in Nevada 
 List of first women lawyers and judges in New Hampshire 
 List of first women lawyers and judges in New Jersey 
 List of first women lawyers and judges in New Mexico 
 List of first women lawyers and judges in New York 
 List of first women lawyers and judges in North Carolina 
 List of first women lawyers and judges in North Dakota 
 List of first women lawyers and judges in Ohio 
 List of first women lawyers and judges in Oklahoma 
 List of first women lawyers and judges in Oregon 
 List of first women lawyers and judges in Pennsylvania 
 List of first women lawyers and judges in Rhode Island 
 List of first women lawyers and judges in South Carolina 
 List of first women lawyers and judges in South Dakota 
 List of first women lawyers and judges in Tennessee 
 List of first women lawyers and judges in Texas 
 List of first women lawyers and judges in Utah 
 List of first women lawyers and judges in Vermont 
 List of first women lawyers and judges in Virginia 
 List of first women lawyers and judges in Washington 
 List of first women lawyers and judges in West Virginia 
 List of first women lawyers and judges in Wisconsin 
 List of first women lawyers and judges in Wyoming

Firsts in Washington, D.C. (Federal District) 

 List of first women lawyers and judges in Washington D.C. (Federal District)

Firsts in the Territories of the U.S. 

 List of first women lawyers and judges in the Territories of the U.S.

See also 
 Timeline of women lawyers in the United States
 Women in law

Other topics of interest 
 List of first minority male lawyers and judges in the United States
 List of African American jurists [United States]
 List of Asian American jurists [United States]
 List of first women lawyers and judges by nationality [International]
 List of Hispanic/Latino American jurists 
 List of Jewish American jurists [United States]
 List of LGBT jurists in the United States
 List of Native American jurists [United States]

References 

Lawyers, United States, first
Women, United States, first
Women, United States, first
Women, first
Lists of American women
American women judges